Matthew Luke Worthington (born 18 December 1997) is an English footballer who plays for Yeovil Town.

Career

Bournemouth
Worthington made his Premier League debut for AFC Bournemouth on the final day of the 2016–17 season where he came on as a 74th minute substitute in a 1–1 away at Leicester City.

Yeovil Town loan
On 31 August 2017, Worthington signed for League Two club Yeovil Town on loan until January 2018.

Forest Green loan
On 31 August 2018, Worthington signed for League Two club Forest Green Rovers on loan until January 2019.

Yeovil Town
On 18 January 2019, Worthington re-signed permanently for League Two club Yeovil Town on a free transfer from AFC Bournemouth, signing a contract until June 2021. Worthington signed a new one-year deal in June 2022.

Career statistics

References

External links
 

1997 births
Living people
English footballers
AFC Bournemouth players
Yeovil Town F.C. players
Premier League players
English Football League players
National League (English football) players
Association football midfielders
Eastbourne Borough F.C. players
Forest Green Rovers F.C. players